The United Nations Forest Hero Award was established in 2011, the International Year of Forests, to recognise individuals who have devoted their lives to protecting forests. Awards are given annually to one person in each of five regions: Africa, Asia and the Pacific, Europe, Latin America and the Caribbean, and North America.

2011 
The 2011 winners were announced at the 2012 UN Forum on Forests in New York. Selected from 90 nominees in 41 countries, the winners were:

 Africa: Paul Nzegha Mzeka, Cameroon
 Asia and the Pacific: Shigeatsu Hatakeyama, Japan
 Europe: Anatoly Lebedev, Russia
 Latin America and the Caribbean: Paulo Adario, Brazil
 North America: Rhiannon Tomtishen and Madison Vorva, USA for their successful campaign to remove palm oil from Girl Scout Cookies

A special award recognised the work of a deceased couple, José Claudio Ribeiro and Maria do Espírito Santo, Brazil.

2012 
The 2012 winners were:

 Africa: Rose Mukankomeje, Rwanda
 Asia and the Pacific: Preecha Siri, Thailand
 Europe: Hayrettin Karaca, Turkey
 Latin America and the Caribbean: Almir Narayamoga Surui, Brazil
 North America: Ariel Lugo, Puerto Rico

See also
 Champions of the Earth
 Heroes of the Environment
 List of environmental awards

References

External links 
 
 International Year of Forests 2011, Forest Heroes Programme & Award

United Nations awards
Awards established in 2011
Palm oil
World forestry
Forestry initiatives
Environmental awards